Bisi is a town in Umzimkhulu Local Municipality in the KwaZulu-Natal province of South Africa.

References

Populated places in the Umzimkhulu Local Municipality